Slingsby is a surname. Notable people with the surname include:
Francis Slingsby (1569–1651), Anglo-Irish soldier of the late sixteenth century
Fred Slingsby, founder of Slingsby Sailplanes Ltd
Guildford Slingsby (1610–1643), Irish politician
Guylford Slingsby (1565–1631), administrator who went on to be Comptroller of the Navy
Henry Slingsby (disambiguation), several people
John Francis Waller (1810–1894), writer publishing magazine articles under the pseudonym of Jonathan Freke Slingsby
John Slingsby (1788–1826), English amateur cricketer
Mary Slingsby (fl. 1670–1685), English actress
Slingsby Bethel (1617–1697), Member of Parliament with republican sympathies, during the period of the English Civil War
Tom Slingsby (born 1984), Australian sailor
William Cecil Slingsby (1849–1929), English mountain climber and alpine explorer